Val Grande National Park is a protected area located in Piedmont, in the north of Italy, at the border with Switzerland. It is most notable for landscapes of the High Alps.

Geography
The park is located in Province of Verbano-Cusio-Ossola and is shared between ten municipalities: Aurano, Beura-Cardezza, Caprezzo, Cossogno, Valle Cannobina, Intragna, Malesco, Miazzina, Premosello-Chiovenda, San Bernardino Verbano, Santa Maria Maggiore, Trontano, and Vogogna.

The park lies entirely in the drainage basin of the Po River. It is located between the valley of Vigezzo in the north, the Cannobina valley in the northwest, the valley of Ossola in the southwest, and Lake Maggiore in the southeast. The park is not populated and is often described as "the largest wilderness in the Alps".

Val Grande and Val Pogallo, two principal valleys inside the park, with the former running southeast and the latter running south, feed the two major rivers in the park. These valleys join into Torrente San Bernardino, a tributary of Lake Maggiore. The majority of the area of the park is forested.

History
Shepherds populated Val Grande since at least the 13th century, and the timber production was active since the 15th century. However, at the end of World War II all population left the area, following the actions of German troops against the Italian resistance in the area in June 1944. The idea to create a national park in Val Grande dates back to 1953. In 1967, the area was designated a Strict Nature Reserve and became the first conservation area with this status in the Italian Alps. In 1974, the Association Italia Nostra developed a detailed plan to establish a national park, and, in the 1980s, the preparation started. The park was established on March 2, 1992. On June 24, 1998 the area of the park was extended.

Tourism
As of 2012, the park had three visitor centers (located in Santa Maria Maggiore, Cossogno, and Premosello-Chiovenda), two museums, and a number of nature itineraries, which should be followed accompanied by a guide.

References

National parks of Italy
Parks in Piedmont
Tourist attractions in Piedmont
Protected areas of the Alps